Stenoma flavicosta is a moth in the family Depressariidae. It was described by Cajetan Felder, Rudolf Felder and Alois Friedrich Rogenhofer in 1875. It is found in Brazil (Amazon region).

References

Moths described in 1875
Stenoma